Tortilla art refers to fine art that uses tortillas as a canvas. The tortilla(s) are baked, often coated with acrylic and painted or screenprinted. The purpose of tortilla art is to reflect the Chicano cultural roots of the artist. Tortilla art is a technique used in many countries.

According to one tortilla artist,

The Great Tortilla Conspiracy is an art group that utilizes tortilla art as a medium, they are located in San Francisco's Mission district, the members include Joseph "Jos" Sances, René Yañez, Rio Yañez, and Art Hazelwood.

See also 
 José Montoya
Jos Sances
René Yañez
Rio Yañez

References

External links 
A list of noteworthy tortilla artists
Joe Bravo 
The Great Tortilla Conspiracy

Artistic techniques
Chicano art
Tortilla
Mexican-American culture